, born , was a Japanese author, poet, playwright, actor, model, Shintoist, nationalist, and founder of the , an unarmed civilian militia. Mishima is considered one of the most important Japanese authors of the 20th century. He was considered for the Nobel Prize in Literature in 1968, but the award went to his countryman and benefactor Yasunari Kawabata. Mishima's work is characterized by "its luxurious vocabulary and decadent metaphors, its fusion of traditional Japanese and modern Western literary styles, and its obsessive assertions of the unity of beauty, eroticism and death", according to author Andrew Rankin. 

Mishima's political activities made him a controversial figure, which he remains in modern Japan. From his mid-30s, Mishima's right-wing ideology was increasingly revealed. He was proud of the traditional culture and spirit of Japan, and opposed what he saw as western-style materialism, along with Japan's postwar democracy, globalism, and communism, worrying that by embracing these ideas the Japanese people would lose their "national essence" (kokutai) and their distinctive cultural heritage (Shinto and Yamato-damashii) to become a "rootless" people. Mishima formed the Tatenokai for the avowed purpose of restoring sacredness and dignity to the Emperor of Japan. On 25 November 1970, Mishima and four members of his militia entered a military base in central Tokyo, took its commandant hostage, and unsuccessfully tried to inspire the Japan Self-Defense Forces to rise up and overthrow Japan's 1947 Constitution (which he called "a constitution of defeat"). After his speech and screaming of "Long live the Emperor!", he committed seppuku.

Life and work

Early life

He chose his pen name when he was 16. Shizue's father, was a scholar of the Chinese classics, and the Hashi family had served the Maeda clan for generations in Kaga Domain. Mishima received his birth name Kimitake (公威, also read Kōi in on-yomi) in honor of  who was a benefactor of Sadatarō. He had a younger sister, who died of typhus in 1945 at the age of 17, and a younger brother, .

Mishima's childhood home was a rented house, though a fairly large two-floor house that was the largest in the neighborhood. He lived with his parents, siblings and paternal grandparents, as well as six maids, a houseboy, and a manservant. His grandfather was in debt, so there were no remarkable household items left on the first floor.

Mishima's early childhood was dominated by the presence of his grandmother, Natsuko, who took the boy and separated him from his immediate family for several years. Natsuko's father, had been a Supreme Court justice, and Iwanojō's adoptive father, had been a bannerman of the Tokugawa House during the Bakumatsu. Natsuko had been raised in the household of Prince Arisugawa Taruhito, and she maintained considerable aristocratic pretensions even after marrying Sadatarō, a bureaucrat who had made his fortune in the newly opened colonial frontier in the north, and who eventually became Governor-General of Karafuto Prefecture on Sakhalin Island. Sadatarō's father, and grandfather, had been farmers. Natsuko was prone to violent outbursts, which are occasionally alluded to in Mishima's works, and to whom some biographers have traced Mishima's fascination with death. She did not allow Mishima to venture into the sunlight, engage in any kind of sport, or play with other boys. He spent much of his time either alone or with female cousins and their dolls.

Mishima returned to his immediate family when he was 12. His father Azusa had a taste for military discipline, and worried Natsuko's style of childrearing was too soft. When Mishima was an infant, Azusa employed parenting tactics such as holding Mishima up to the side of a speeding train. He also raided his son's room for evidence of an "effeminate" interest in literature, and often ripped his son's manuscripts apart. Although Azusa forbade him to write any further stories, Mishima continued to write in secret, supported and protected by his mother, who was always the first to read a new story.

When Mishima was 13, Natsuko took him to see his first Kabuki play: Kanadehon Chūshingura, an allegory of the story of the 47 Rōnin. He was later taken to his first Noh play (Miwa, a story featuring Amano-Iwato) by his maternal grandmother . From these early experiences, Mishima became addicted to Kabuki and Noh. He began attending performances every month and grew deeply interested in these traditional Japanese dramatic art forms.

Schooling and early works

Mishima was enrolled at the age of six in the elite Gakushūin, the Peers' School in Tokyo, which had been established in the Meiji period to educate the Imperial family and the descendants of the old feudal nobility. At 12, Mishima began to write his first stories. He read myths (Kojiki, Greek mythology, etc.) and the works of numerous classic Japanese authors as well as Raymond Radiguet, Jean Cocteau, Oscar Wilde, Rainer Maria Rilke, Thomas Mann, Friedrich Nietzsche, Charles Baudelaire, l'Isle-Adam, and other European authors in translation. He also studied German. After six years at school, he became the youngest member of the editorial board of its literary society. Mishima was attracted to the works of the Japanese poet , poet and novelist , and poet , who inspired Mishima's appreciation of classical Japanese waka poetry. Mishima's early contributions to the Gakushūin literary magazine  included haiku and waka poetry before he turned his attention to prose.

In 1941, at the age of 16, Mishima was invited to write a short story for the Hojinkai-zasshi, and he submitted , a story in which the narrator describes the feeling that his ancestors somehow still live within him. The story uses the type of metaphors and aphorisms that became Mishima's trademarks. He mailed a copy of the manuscript to his Japanese teacher  for constructive criticism. Shimizu was so impressed that he took the manuscript to a meeting of the editorial board of the prestigious literary magazine , of which he was a member. At the editorial board meeting, the other board members read the story and were very impressed; they congratulated themselves for discovering a genius and published it in the magazine. The story was later published as a limited book edition (4,000 copies) in 1944 due to a wartime paper shortage. Mishima had it published as a keepsake to remember him by, as he assumed that he would die in the war.

In order to protect him from potential backlash from Azusa, Shimizu and the other editorial board members coined the pen-name Yukio Mishima. They took "Mishima" from Mishima Station, which Shimizu and fellow Bungei Bunka board member Hasuda Zenmei passed through on their way to the editorial meeting, which was held in Izu, Shizuoka. The name "Yukio" came from yuki (雪), the Japanese word for "snow", because of the snow they saw on Mount Fuji as the train passed. In the magazine, Hasuda praised Mishima's genius as follows:This youthful author is a heaven-sent child of eternal Japanese history. He is much younger than we are, but has arrived on the scene already quite mature.Hasuda, who became something of a mentor to Mishima, was an ardent nationalist and a fan of Motoori Norinaga (1730–1801), a scholar of kokugaku from the Edo period who preached Japanese traditional values and devotion to the Emperor. Hasuda had previously fought for the Imperial Japanese Army in China in 1938, and in 1943 he was recalled to active service for deployment as a first lieutenant in the Southeast Asian theater. At a farewell party thrown for Hasuda by the Bungei Bunka group, Hasuda offered the following parting words to Mishima: I have entrusted the future of Japan to you.According to Mishima, these words were deeply meaningful to him, and had a profound effect on the future course of his life.

Later in 1941, Mishima wrote in his notebook an essay about his deep devotion to Shintō, titled . Mishima's story , published in 1946, describes a homosexual love he felt at school and being teased from members of the school's rugby union club because he belonged to the literary society. Another story from 1954, was also based on Mishima's memories of his time at Gakushūin Junior High School.

On 9 September 1944, Mishima graduated Gakushūin High School at the top of the class, and became a graduate representative. Emperor Hirohito was present at the graduation ceremony, and Mishima later received a silver watch from the Emperor at the Imperial Household Ministry.

On 27 April 1944, during the final years of World War II, Mishima received a draft notice for the Imperial Japanese Army and barely passed his conscription examination on 16 May 1944, with a less desirable rating of "second class" conscript. He had a cold during his medical check on convocation day (10 February 1945), and the young army doctor misdiagnosed Mishima with tuberculosis, declared him unfit for service, and sent him home. Scholars have argued that Mishima's failure to receive a "first class" rating on his conscription exam (reserved only for the most physically fit recruits), in combination with the illness which led him to be erroneously declared unfit for duty, contributed to an inferiority complex over his frail constitution that later led to his obsession with physical fitness and bodybuilding.

The day before his failed medical exam, Mishima wrote a farewell message to his family, ending with the words , and prepared clippings of his hair and nails to be kept as mementos by his parents. The troops of the unit that Mishima was supposed to have joined were sent to the Philippines, where most of them were killed. Mishima's parents were ecstatic that he did not have to go to war, but Mishima's mood was harder to read; Mishima's mother overheard him say he wished he could have joined a "Special Attack" (特攻, tokkō) unit. Around that time, Mishima admired kamikaze pilots and other "special attack" units in letters to friends and private notes.

Mishima was deeply affected by Emperor Hirohito's radio broadcast announcing Japan's surrender on 15 August 1945, and vowed to protect Japanese cultural traditions and help rebuild Japanese culture after the destruction of the war. He wrote in his diary: Only by preserving Japanese irrationality will we be able contribute to world culture 100 years from now.
On 19 August, four days after Japan's surrender, Mishima's mentor Zenmei Hasuda, who had been drafted and deployed to the Malay peninsula, shot and killed his superior officer, believing he was a Korean spy, before turning his pistol on himself. Mishima learned of the incident a year later and contributed poetry in Hasuda's honor at a memorial service in November 1946. On 23 October 1945 (Showa 20), Mishima's beloved younger sister Mitsuko died suddenly at the age of 17 from typhoid fever by drinking untreated water. Around that same time he also learned that , a classmate's sister whom he had hoped to marry, was engaged to another man. These tragic incidents in 1945 became a powerful motive force in inspiring Mishima's future literary work.

At the end of the war, his father Azusa "half-allowed" Mishima to become a novelist. He was worried that his son could actually become a professional novelist, and hoped instead that his son would be a bureaucrat like himself and Mishima's grandfather Sadatarō. He advised his son to enroll in the Faculty of Law instead of the literature department.  Attending lectures during the day and writing at night, Mishima graduated from the University of Tokyo in 1947. He obtained a position in the Ministry of the Treasury and seemed set up for a promising career as a government bureaucrat. However, after just one year of employment Mishima had exhausted himself so much that his father agreed to allow him to resign from his post and devote himself to writing full time.

In 1945, Mishima began the short story  and continued to work on it through the end of World War II. After the war, it was praised by Shizuo Itō whom Mishima respected.

Post-war literature

After Japan's defeat in World War II, the country was occupied by the U.S.-led Allied Powers. At the urging of the occupation authorities, many people who held important posts in various fields were purged from public office. The media and publishing industry were also censored, and were not allowed to engage in forms of expression reminiscent of wartime Japanese nationalism. In addition, literary figures, including many of those who had been close to Mishima before the end of the war, were branded "war criminal literary figures". Some people denounced them and converted to left-wing politics, whom Mishima criticized as "opportunists" in his letters to friends. Some prominent literary figures became leftists, and joined the Communist Party as a reaction against wartime militarism and writing socialist realist literature that might support the cause of socialist revolution. Their influence had increased in the Japanese literary world following the end of the war, which Mishima found difficult to accept. Although Mishima was just 20 years old at this time, he worried that his type of literature, based on the 1930s , had already become obsolete.

Mishima had heard that famed writer Yasunari Kawabata had praised his work before the end of the war. Kawabata was impressed, and in June 1946, following Kawabata's recommendation, "The Cigarette" was published in the new literary magazine , followed by "The Middle Ages" in December 1946. "The Middle Ages" is set in Japan's historical Muromachi Period and explores the motif of shudō (衆道, man-boy love) against a backdrop of the death of the ninth Ashikaga shogun  in battle at the age of 25, and his father 's resultant sadness. The story features the fictional character Kikuwaka, a beautiful teenage boy who was beloved by both Yoshihisa and Yoshimasa, who fails in an attempt to follow Yoshihisa in death by committing suicide. Thereafter, Kikuwaka devotes himself to spiritualism in an attempt to heal Yoshimasa's sadness by allowing Yoshihisa's ghost to possess his body, and eventually dies in a double-suicide with a miko (巫女, shrine maiden) who falls in love with him. Mishima wrote the story in an elegant style drawing upon medieval Japanese literature and the Ryōjin Hishō, a collection of medieval imayō songs. This elevated writing style and the homosexual motif suggest the germ of Mishima's later aesthetics. Later in 1948 Kawabata, who praised this work, published an autobiographical work  describing his experience of falling in love for the first time with a boy two years his junior.

In 1946, Mishima began his first novel, a story about two young members of the aristocracy drawn towards suicide. It was published in 1948, and placed Mishima in the ranks of the Second Generation of Postwar Writers. The following year, he published , a semi-autobiographical account of a young homosexual man who hides behind a mask to fit into society. The novel was extremely successful and made Mishima a celebrity at the age of 24.

Mishima enjoyed international travel. He visited Greece during his travels, a place which had fascinated him since childhood. His visit to Greece became the basis for his 1954 novel , which drew inspiration from the Greek legend of Daphnis and Chloe. Although the novel became a best-seller, leftists criticized it for "glorifying old-fashioned Japanese values", and some people began calling Mishima a "fascist". Looking back on these attacks in later years, Mishima wrote, "The ancient community ethics portrayed in this novel were attacked by progressives at the time, but no matter how much the Japanese people changed, these ancient ethics lurk in the bottom of their hearts. We have gradually seen this proven to be the case."

Mishima made use of contemporary events in many of his works. , published in 1956, is a fictionalization of the burning down of the Kinkaku-ji Buddhist temple in Kyoto in 1950 by a mentally disturbed monk.

In 1959, Mishima published the artistically ambitious novel . The novel tells the interconnected stories of four young men who represented four different facets of Mishima's personality. His athletic side appears as a boxer, his artistic side as a painter, his narcissistic, performative side as an actor, and his secretive, nihilistic side as a businessman who goes through the motions of living a normal life while practicing "absolute contempt for reality". According to Mishima, he was attempting to describe the time around 1955 in the novel, when Japan was entering into its era of high economic growth and the phrase "The postwar is over" was prevalent.  Mishima explained, "Kyōko no Ie is, so to speak, my research into the nihilism within me." Although the novel was well received by a small number of critics from the same generation as Mishima and sold 150,000 copies in a month, it was widely panned in broader literary circles, and was rapidly branded as Mishima's first "failed work". It was Mishima's first major setback as an author, and the book's disastrous reception came as a harsh psychological blow.

Many of Mishima's most famous and highly regarded works were written prior to 1960. However, until that year he had not written works that were seen as especially political. In the summer of 1960, Mishima became interested in the massive Anpo protests against an attempt by U.S.-backed Prime Minister Nobusuke Kishi to revise the Treaty of Mutual Cooperation and Security Between the United States and Japan (known as "Anpo" in Japanese) in order to cement the U.S.–Japan military alliance into place. Although he did not directly participate in the protests, he often went out in the streets to observe the protestors in action and kept extensive newspaper clipping covering the protests. In June 1960, at the climax of the protest movement, Mishima wrote a commentary in the Mainichi Shinbun newspaper, entitled "A Political Opinion". In the critical essay, he argued that leftist groups such as the Zengakuren student federation, the Socialist Party, and the Communist Party were falsely wrapping themselves in the banner of "defending democracy" and using the protest movement to further their own ends. Mishima warned against the dangers of the Japanese people following ideologues who told lies with honeyed words. Although Mishima criticized Kishi as a "nihilist" who had subordinated himself to the United States, Mishima concluded that he would rather vote for a strong-willed realist "with neither dreams nor despair" than a mendacious but eloquent ideologue.

Shortly after the Anpo Protests ended, Mishima began writing one of his most famous short stories, glorifying the actions of a young right-wing ultranationalist Japanese army officer who commits suicide after a failed revolt against the government during the February 26 Incident. The following year, he published the first two parts of his three-part play , which celebrates the actions of the 26 February revolutionaries.

Mishima's newfound interest in contemporary politics shaped his novel , also published in 1960, which so closely followed the events surrounding politician Hachirō Arita's campaign to become governor of Tokyo that Mishima was sued for invasion of privacy. The next year, Mishima published , a parody of the classical Noh play Motomezuka, written in the 14th-century playwright Kiyotsugu Kan'ami. In 1962, Mishima produced his most artistically avant-garde work , which at times comes close to science fiction. Although the novel received mixed reviews from the literary world, prominent critic Takeo Okuno singled it out for praise as part of a new breed of novels that was overthrowing longstanding literary conventions in the tumultuous aftermath of the Anpo Protests. Alongside Kōbō Abe's , published that same year, Okuno considered A Beautiful Star an "epoch-making work" which broke free of literary taboos and preexisting notions of what literature should be in order to explore the author's personal creativity.

In 1965, Mishima wrote the play  that explores the complex figure of the Marquis de Sade, traditionally upheld as an exemplar of vice, through a series of debates between six female characters, including the Marquis' wife, the Madame de Sade. At the end of the play, Mishima offers his own interpretation of what he considered to be one of the central mysteries of the de Sade story—the Madame de Sade's unstinting support for her husband while he was in prison and her sudden decision to renounce him upon his release. Mishima's play was inspired in part by his friend Tatsuhiko Shibusawa's 1960 Japanese translation of the Marquis de Sade's novel Juliette and a 1964 biography Shibusawa wrote of de Sade. Shibusawa's sexually explicit translation became the focus of a sensational obscenity trial remembered in Japan as the "Sade Case" (サド裁判, Sado saiban), which was ongoing as Mishima wrote the play.  In 1994, Madame de Sade was evaluated as the "greatest drama in the history of postwar theater" by Japanese theater criticism magazine Theater Arts.

Mishima was considered for the Nobel Prize for Literature in 1963, 1964, and 1965, and was a favorite of many foreign publications. However, in 1968 his early mentor Kawabata won the Nobel Prize and Mishima realized that the chances of it being given to another Japanese author in the near future were slim. In a work published in 1970, Mishima wrote that the writers he paid most attention to in modern western literature were Georges Bataille, Pierre Klossowski, and Witold Gombrowicz.

Acting and modelling
Mishima was also an actor, and starred in Yasuzo Masumura's 1960 film, for which he also sang the theme song (lyrics by himself; music by Shichirō Fukazawa).

American author Donald Richie gave an eyewitness account of seeing Mishima, dressed in a loincloth and armed with a sword, posing in the snow for one of Tamotsu Yatō's photoshoots.

In the men's magazine Heibon Punch, to which Mishima had contributed various essays and criticisms, he won first place in the "Mr. Dandy" reader popularity poll in 1967 with 19,590 votes, beating second place Toshiro Mifune by 720 votes. In the next reader popularity poll, "Mr. International", Mishima ranked second behind French President Charles de Gaulle. At that time in the late 1960s, Mishima was the first celebrity to be described as a "superstar" (sūpāsutā) by the Japanese media.

Private life

In 1955, Mishima took up weight training to overcome his weak constitution, and his strictly observed workout regimen of three sessions per week was not disrupted for the final 15 years of his life. In his 1968 essay , Mishima deplored the emphasis given by intellectuals to the mind over the body. He later became very skilled (5th Dan) at kendo (traditional Japanese swordsmanship), and became 2nd Dan in battōjutsu, and 1st Dan in karate. In 1956, he tried boxing for a short period of time. Mishima hoped to marry her, but they broke up in 1957.

The couple had two children: a daughter named  (born 2 June 1959) and a son named  (born 2 May 1962). Noriko eventually married the diplomat .

While working on his novel , Mishima visited gay bars in Japan. Mishima's sexual orientation was an issue that bothered his wife, and she always denied his homosexuality after his death. In 1998, the writer  published an account of his relationship with Mishima in 1951, including fifteen letters (not love letters) from the famed novelist. Mishima's children successfully sued Fukushima and the publisher for copyright violation over the use of Mishima's letters. Publisher Bungeishunjū had argued that the contents of the letters were "practical correspondence" rather than copyrighted works. However, the ruling for the plaintiffs declared, "In addition to clerical content, these letters describe the Mishima's own feelings, his aspirations, and his views on life, in different words from those in his literary works."

In 1960, the author  had published the satirical short story  in the mainstream magazine Chūō Kōron. It contained a dream sequence (in which the Emperor and Empress are beheaded by a guillotine) that led to outrage from right-wing ultra-nationalist groups, and numerous death threats against Fukazawa, any writers believed to have been associated with him, and Chūō Kōron magazine itself. In the aftermath, Fukazawa went into hiding, and dozens of writers and literary critics, including Mishima, were provided with round-the-clock police protection for several months; Mishima was included because a rumor that Mishima had personally recommended "The Tale of an Elegant Dream" for publication became widespread, and even though he repeatedly denied the claim, he received hundreds of death threats. In later years, Mishima harshly criticized Komori, arguing that those who harm women and children are neither patriots nor traditional right-wingers, and that an assassination attempt should be a one-on-one confrontation with the victim at the risk of the assassin's life. Mishima also argued that it was the custom of traditional Japanese patriots to immediately commit suicide after committing an assassination.

In 1963, the Harp of Joy Incident occurred within the theatrical troupe , to which Mishima belonged. He wrote a play titled , but star actress  and other Communist Party-affiliated actors refused to perform because the protagonist held anti-communist views and mentioned criticism about a conspiracy of world communism in his lines.

During the Tokyo Olympics in 1964, Mishima interviewed various athletes every day and wrote articles as a newspaper correspondent. He had eagerly anticipated the long-awaited return of the Olympics to Japan after the 1940 Tokyo Olympics were cancelled due to Japan's war in China. Mishima expressed his excitement in his report on the opening ceremonies: "It can be said that ever since Lafcadio Hearn called the Japanese "the Greeks of the Orient," the Olympics were destined to be hosted by Japan someday."

Mishima hated Ryokichi Minobe, who was a communist and the governor of Tokyo beginning in 1967. Influential persons in the conservative Liberal Democratic Party (LDP), including Takeo Fukuda and Kiichi Aichi, had been Mishima's superiors during his time at the Ministry of the Treasury, and Prime Minister Eisaku Satō came to know Mishima because his wife, Hiroko, was a fan of Mishima's work. Based on these connections LDP officials solicited Mishima to run for the LDP as governor of Tokyo against Minobe, but Mishima had no intention of becoming a politician.

Mishima especially loved reading the boxing manga  in Weekly Shōnen Magazine every week. Ultraman and Godzilla were his favorite kaiju fantasies, and he once compared himself to "Godzilla's egg" in 1955. On the other hand, he disliked story manga with humanist or cosmopolitan themes, such as Osamu Tezuka's .

Mishima was a fan of science fiction, contending that "science fiction will be the first literature to completely overcome modern humanism". He praised Arthur C. Clarke's Childhood's End in particular. While acknowledging "inexpressible unpleasant and uncomfortable feelings after reading it," he declared, "I'm not afraid to call it a masterpiece."

Mishima traveled to Shimoda on the Izu Peninsula with his wife and children every summer from 1964 onwards. In Shimoda, Mishima often enjoyed eating local seafood with his friend Henry Scott-Stokes. Mishima never showed any hostility towards the US in front of foreign friends like Scott-Stokes, until Mishima heard that the name of the inn where Scott-Stokes was staying was Kurofune, at which point his voice suddenly became low and he said in a sullen manner, "Why? Why do you stay at a place with such a name?". Mishima liked ordinary American people after the war, and he and his wife had even visited Disneyland as newlyweds. However, he clearly retained a strong sense of hostility toward the "black ships" of Commodore Matthew C. Perry, who forcibly opened Japan up to unequal international relations at the end of the Edo period, and had destroyed the peace of Edo, where vivid chōnin culture was flourishing.

Harmony of Pen and Sword
Mishima's nationalism grew towards the end of his life. In 1966, he published his short story , in which he denounced Emperor Hirohito for renouncing his own divinity after World War II. Mishima said that His Imperial Majesty had become a human when he should be a God.

In February 1967, Mishima joined fellow authors Yasunari Kawabata, Kōbō Abe, and Jun Ishikawa in issuing a statement condemning China's Cultural Revolution for suppressing academic and artistic freedom. However, only one Japanese newspaper carried the full text of their statement.

In September 1967 Mishima and his wife visited India at the invitation of the Indian government. He traveled widely and met with Prime Minister Indira Gandhi and President Zakir Hussain. He left extremely impressed by Indian culture, and what he felt was the Indian people's determination to resist Westernization and protect traditional ways. Mishima feared that his fellow Japanese were too enamored of modernization and western-style materialism to protect traditional Japanese culture. While in New Delhi, he spoke at length with an unnamed colonel in the Indian Army who had experienced skirmishes with Chinese troops on the Sino-Indian border. The colonel warned Mishima of the strength and fighting spirit of the Chinese troops. Mishima later spoke of his sense of danger regarding what he perceived to be a lack of concern in Japan about the need to bolster Japan's national defense against the threat from Communist China. On his way home from India, Mishima also stopped in Thailand and Laos; his experiences in the three nations became the basis for portions of his novel , the third in his tetralogy .

In 1968, Mishima wrote a play titled , in which he depicted the historical figures of Adolf Hitler, Gustav Krupp, Gregor Strasser, and Ernst Röhm as mouthpieces to express his own views on fascism and beauty. Mishima explained that after writing the all-female play Madame de Sade, he wanted to write a counterpart play with an all-male cast. Mishima wrote of My Friend Hitler, "You may read this tragedy as an allegory of the relationship between Ōkubo Toshimichi and Saigō Takamori" (two heroes of Japan's Meiji Restoration who initially worked together but later had a falling out).

That same year, he wrote , a humorous story about a man who, after failing to commit suicide, advertises his life for sale. In a review of the English translation, novelist Ian Thomson called it a "pulp noir" and a "sexy, camp delight", but also noted that, "beneath the hard-boiled dialogue and the gangster high jinks is a familiar indictment of consumerist Japan and a romantic yearning for the past."

Mishima was hated by leftists who said Hirohito should have abdicated to take responsibility for the loss of life in the war. Mishima regarded the postwar era of Japan, where no poetic culture and supreme artist was born, as an era of fake prosperity, and stated in The Defense of Culture: In the postwar prosperity called Shōwa Genroku, where there are no Chikamatsu Monzaemon, Ihara Saikaku, Matsuo Bashō, only infestation of flashy manners and customs in there. Passion is dried up, strong realism dispels the ground, and the deepening of poetry is neglected. That is, there are no Chikamatsu, Saikaku, or Basho now. In other critical essays, Mishima argued that the national spirit which cultivated in Japan's long history is the key to national defense, and he had apprehensions about the insidious "indirect aggression" of the Chinese Communist Party, North Korea, and the Soviet Union. In critical essays in 1969, Mishima explained Japan's difficult and delicate position and peculiarities between China, the Soviet Union, and the United States. To put it simply, support for the Security Treaty means agreeing with the United States, and to oppose it means agreeing with the Soviet Union or the Chinese Communist Party, so after all, it's only just a matter of which foreign country to rely on, and therein the question of "what is Japan" is completely lacking. If you ask the Japanese, "Hey you, do you choose America, Soviet Union, or Chinese Communist Party?", if he is a true Japanese, he will withhold his attitude. collected in (dialogue with Hayashi Fusao) In regards to those who strongly opposed the US military base in Okinawa and the Security Treaty: They may appear to be nationalists and right-wingers in the foreign common sense, but in Japan, most of them are in fact left-wingers and communists.Throughout this period, Mishima continued to work on his magnum opus, The Sea of Fertility tetralogy of novels, which began appearing in a monthly serialized format in September 1965. The four completed novels were Spring Snow (1969), Runaway Horses (1969), The Temple of Dawn (1970), and The Decay of the Angel (published posthumously in 1971). Mishima aimed for a very long novel with a completely different raison d'être from Western chronicle novels of the 19th and 20th centuries; rather than telling the story of a single individual or family, Mishima boldly set his goal as interpreting the entire human world. In The Decay of the Angel, four stories convey the transmigration of the human soul as the main character goes through a series of reincarnations. Mishima hoped to express in literary terms something akin to pantheism. Novelist Paul Theroux blurbed the first edition of the English translation of The Sea of Fertility as "the most complete vision we have of Japan in the twentieth century" and critic Charles Solomon wrote in 1990 that "the four novels remain one of the outstanding works of 20th-Century literature and a summary of the author's life and work".

Coup attempt and ritual suicide

While in Kumamoto, Mishima purchased a Japanese sword for 100,000 yen.

From 12 April to 27 May 1967, Mishima underwent basic training with the Ground Self-Defense Force (GSDF). Mishima had originally lobbied to train with the GSDF for six months, but was met with resistance from the Defense Agency. Mishima's training period was finalized to 46 days, which required using some of his connections. His participation in GSDF training was kept secret, both because the Defense Agency did not want to give the impression that anyone was receiving special treatment, and because Mishima wanted to experience "real" military life. Accordingly, Mishima trained under his birth name, Kimitake Hiraoka, and most of his fellow soldiers did not recognize him.

From June 1967, Mishima became a leading figure in a plan to create a 10,000-man  as a civilian complement to Japan's Self Defense Forces. He began leading groups of right-wing college students to undergo basic training with the GDSF in the hope of training 100 officers to lead the National Guard.

Like many other right-wingers, Mishima was especially alarmed by the riots and revolutionary actions undertaken by radical "New Left" university students, who took over dozens of college campuses in Japan in 1968 and 1969. On 26 February 1968, the 32nd anniversary of the February 26 Incident, he and several other right-wingers met at the editorial offices of the recently founded right-wing magazine , where they pricked their little fingers and signed a blood oath promising to die if necessary to prevent a left-wing revolution from occurring in Japan. Mishima showed his sincerity by signing his birth name, Kimitake Hiraoka, in his own blood.

The activities of the Tatenokai primarily focused on martial training and physical fitness, including traditional kendo sword-fighting and long-distance running. Mishima personally oversaw this training himself. Initial membership was around 50, and was drawn primarily from students from Waseda University and individuals affiliated with Controversy Journal. The number of Tatenokai members later increased to 100. Some of the members had graduated from university and were employed, while some were already working adults when they enlisted.

On 25 November 1970, Mishima and four members of the Tatenokai—, and —used a pretext to visit the commandant  of Camp Ichigaya, a military base in central Tokyo and the headquarters of the Eastern Command of the Japan Self-Defense Forces. Inside, they barricaded the office and tied the commandant to his chair. With a prepared manifesto and a banner listing their demands, Mishima stepped out onto the balcony to address the soldiers gathered below. His speech was intended to inspire a coup d'état to restore the power of the emperor. He succeeded only in irritating the soldiers, and was heckled, with jeers and the noise of helicopters drowning out some parts of his speech. In his speech Mishima rebuked the JSDF for their passive acceptance of a constitution that "denies (their) own existence" and shouted to rouse them, "Where has the spirit of the samurai gone?" In his final written appeal that Morita and Ogawa scattered copies of from the balcony, Mishima expressed his dissatisfaction with the half-baked nature of the JSDF: It is self-evident that the United States would not be pleased with a true Japanese volunteer army protecting the land of Japan.After he finished reading his prepared speech in a few minutes' time, Mishima cried out  three times. He then retreated into the commandant's office and apologized to the commandant, saying, "We did it to return the JSDF to the Emperor. I had no choice but to do this."Mishima then committed seppuku, a form of ritual suicide by disembowelment associated with the samurai. Morita had been assigned to serve as Mishima's second (kaishakunin), cutting off his head with a sword at the end of the ritual to spare him unnecessary pain. However, Morita proved unable to complete his task, and after three failed attempts to sever Mishima's head, Koga had to step in and complete the task.

According to the testimony of the surviving coup members, originally all four Tatenokai members had planned to commit seppuku along with Mishima. However Mishima attempted to dissuade them and three of the members acquiesced to his wishes. Only Morita persisted, saying, "I can't let Mr. Mishima die alone." But Mishima knew that Morita had a girlfriend and still hoped he might live. Just before his seppuku, Mishima tried one more time to dissuade him, saying "Morita, you must live, not die." Nevertheless, after Mishima's seppuku, Morita knelt and stabbed himself in the abdomen and Koga acted as kaishakunin again.

This coup attempt is called  in Japan.

Another traditional element of the suicide ritual was the composition of so-called death poems by the Tatenokai members before their entry into the headquarters. Having been enlisted in the Ground Self-Defense Force for about four years, Mishima and other Tatenokai members, alongside several officials, were secretly researching coup plans for a constitutional amendment. They thought there was a chance when  was dispatched to subjugate the Zenkyoto revolt. However, Zenkyoto was suppressed easily by the Riot Police Unit in October 1969. These officials gave up the coup of constitutional amendment, and Mishima was disappointed in them and the actual circumstances in Japan after World War II. Officer , Mishima's training teacher, explained further: The officers had a trusty connection with the U.S.A.F. (includes U.S.F.J), and with the approval of the U.S. army side, they were supposed to carry out a security dispatch toward the Armed Forces of the Japan Self-Defense Forces. However, due to the policy change (reversal) of U.S. by Henry Kissinger who prepared for visiting China in secret (changing relations between U.S. and China), it became a situation where the Japanese military was not allowed legally.Mishima planned his suicide meticulously for at least a year and no one outside the group of hand-picked Tatenokai members knew what he was planning. His biographer, translator John Nathan, suggests that the coup attempt was only a pretext for the ritual suicide of which Mishima had long dreamed. His friend Scott-Stokes, another biographer, says that "Mishima is the most important person in postwar Japan", and described the shackles of the constitution of Japan: Mishima cautioned against the lack of reality in the basic political controversy in Japan and the particularity of Japan's democratic principles.Scott-Stokes noted a meeting with Mishima in his diary entry for 3 September 1970, at which Mishima, with a dark expression on his face, said: Japan lost its spiritual tradition, and materialism infested instead. Japan is under the curse of a Green Snake now. The Green Snake bites on Japanese chest. There is no way to escape this curse. Scott-Stokes told Takao Tokuoka in 1990 that he took the Green Snake to mean the U.S. dollar. Between 1968 and 1970, Mishima also said words about Japan's future. Mishima's senior friend and father heard from Mishima: Japan will be hit hard. One day, the United States suddenly contacts China over Japan's head, Japan will only be able to look up from the bottom of the valley and eavesdrop on the conversation slightly. Our friend Taiwan will say that "it will no longer be able to count on Japan", and Taiwan will go somewhere. Japan may become an orphan in the Orient, and may eventually fall into the product of slave dealers.Mishima's corpse was returned home the day after his death. His father Azusa had been afraid to see his son whose appearance had completely changed. However, when he looked into the casket fearfully, Mishima's head and body had been sutured neatly, and his dead face, to which makeup had been beautifully applied, looked as if he were alive due to the police officers. They said: "We applied funeral makeup carefully with special feelings, because it is the body of Dr. Mishima, whom we have always respected secretly." Mishima's body was dressed in the Tatenokai uniform, and the guntō was firmly clasped at the chest according to the will that Mishima entrusted to his friend . Azusa put the manuscript papers and fountain pen that his son cherished in the casket together. Mishima had made sure his affairs were in order and left money for the legal defence of the three surviving Tatenokai members—, and Hiroyasu Koga. After the incident, there were exaggerated media commentaries that "it was a fear of the revival of militarism". The commandant who was made a hostage said in the trial, I didn't feel hate towards the defendants at that time. Thinking about the country of Japan, thinking about the JSDF, the pure hearts of thinking about our country that did that kind of thing, I want to buy it as an individual.The day of the Mishima Incident (25 November) was the date when Hirohito (Emperor Shōwa) became regent and the Emperor Shōwa made the Humanity Declaration at the age of 45. Researchers believe that Mishima chose that day to revive the "God" by dying as a scapegoat, at the same age as when the Emperor became a human. On his birthday, Mishima's remains were buried in the grave of the Hiraoka Family at Tama Cemetery. In addition, 25 November is the day he began writing Confessions of a Mask (仮面の告白, Kamen no kokuhaku), and this work was announced as "Techniques of Life Recovery", "Suicide inside out". Mishima also wrote down in notes for this work, This book is a will for leave in the Realm of Death where I used to live. If you take a movie of a suicide jumped, and rotate the film in reverse, the suicide person jumps up from the valley bottom to the top of the cliff at a furious speed and he revives. Writer Takashi Inoue believes he wrote Confessions of a Mask to live in postwar Japan, and to get away from his "Realm of Death"; by dying on the same date that he began to write Confessions of a Mask, Mishima intended to dismantle all of his postwar creative activities and return to the "Realm of Death" where he used to live.

Legacy

Much speculation has surrounded Mishima's suicide. At the time of his death he had just completed the final book in his Sea of Fertility tetralogy. He was recognized as one of the most important post-war stylists of the Japanese language. Mishima wrote 34 novels, about 50 plays, about 25 books of short stories, at least 35 books of essays, one libretto, and one film.

Mishima's grave is located at the Tama Cemetery in Fuchū, Tokyo. The Mishima Prize was established in 1988 to honor his life and works. On 3 July 1999,  was opened in Yamanakako, Yamanashi Prefecture.

Compared to older groups such as Bin Akao's Greater Japan Patriotic Party that took a pro-American, anti-communist stance, New Right groups such as the Issuikai tended to emphasize ethnic nationalism and anti-Americanism.

Apart from this, a memorial service is held every year by former Tatenokai members, which began in 1975, the year after Masahiro Ogawa, Masayoshi Koga, and Hiroyasu Koga were released on parole.

A variety of cenotaphs and memorial stones have been erected in honor of Mishima's memory in various places around Japan. For example, stones have been erected at Hachiman Shrine in Kakogawa City, Hyogo Prefecture, where his grandfather's permanent domicile was; in front of the 2nd company corps at JGSDF Camp Takigahara; and in one of Mishima's acquaintance's home garden. There is also a "Monument of Honor Yukio Mishima & Masakatsu Morita" in front of the Rissho University Shonan High school in Shimane Prefecture.

The Mishima Yukio Shrine was built in the suburb of Fujinomiya, Shizuoka Prefecture, on 9 January 1983.

A 1985 biographical film by Paul Schrader titled Mishima: A Life in Four Chapters depicts his life and work; however, it has never been given a theatrical presentation in Japan. A 2012 Japanese film titled 11:25 The Day He Chose His Own Fate also looks at Mishima's last day. The 1983 gay pornographic film Beautiful Mystery satirised the homosexual undertones of Mishima's career.

In 2014, Mishima was one of the inaugural honourees in the Rainbow Honor Walk, a walk of fame in San Francisco's Castro neighbourhood noting LGBTQ people who have "made significant contributions in their fields".

David Bowie painted a large expressionist portrait of Mishima, which he hung at his Berlin residence.

Awards
 Shincho Prize from Shinchosha Publishing, 1954, for The Sound of Waves
 Kishida Prize for Drama from Shinchosha Publishing, 1955 for 
 Yomiuri Prize from Yomiuri Newspaper Co., for best novel, 1956, The Temple of the Golden Pavilion
 Shuukan Yomiuri Prize for Shingeki from Yomiuri Newspaper Co., 1958, for 
 Yomiuri Prize from Yomiuri Newspaper Co., for best drama, 1961, 
 One of six finalists for the Nobel Prize in Literature, 1963.
 Mainichi Art Prize from Mainichi Shimbun, 1964, for Silk and Insight
 Art Festival Prize from the Ministry of Education, 1965, for Madame de Sade

Major works

Literature

Critical essay

Plays for classical Japanese theatre
In addition to contemporary-style plays such as Madame de Sade, Mishima wrote for two of the three genres of classical Japanese theatre: Noh and Kabuki (as a proud Tokyoite, he would not even attend the Bunraku puppet theatre, always associated with Osaka and the provinces).

Though Mishima took themes, titles and characters from the Noh canon, his twists and modern settings, such as hospitals and ballrooms, startled audiences accustomed to the long-settled originals.

Donald Keene translated  (Tuttle, 1981). Most others remain untranslated and so lack an "official" English title; in such cases it is therefore preferable to use the rōmaji title.

Films
Mishima starred in multiple films. Patriotism was written and funded by himself, and he directed it in close cooperation with Masaki Domoto. Mishima also wrote a detailed account of the whole process, in which the particulars regarding costume, shooting expenses and the film's reception are delved into. Patriotism won the second prize at the Tours International Short Film Festival in January 1966.

Works about Mishima
Collection of Photographs
 Ba-ra-kei: Ordeal by Roses (薔薇刑) by Eikō Hosoe and Mishima (photoerotic collection of images of Mishima, with his own commentary, 1963) (Aperture 2002 )
 Grafica: Yukio Mishima by Kōichi Saitō, Kishin Shinoyama, Takeyoshi Tanuma, Ken Domon, Masahisa Fukase, Eikō Hosoe, Ryūji Miyamoto etc. (photoerotic collection of Yukio Mishima) (Shinchosha 1990 )
 Yukio Mishima's house by Kishin Shinoyama (Bijutsu Shuppansha 1995 )
 The Death of a Man by Kishin Shinoyama and Mishima (photo collection of death images of Japanese men including a sailor, a construction worker, a fisherman, and a soldier, those were Mishima did modeling in 1970) (Rizzoli 2020 )

Books
 Reflections on the Death Of Mishima by Henry Miller (1972) 
 The Day He Himself Shall Wipe My Tears Away by Kenzaburō Ōe (Kodansha, 1972) – In addition to this, Kenzaburō Ōe wrote several works that mention the Mishima incident and Mishima a little.
 Mishima: A Biography by John Nathan (Boston, Little, Brown and Company 1974)
 The Life and Death of Yukio Mishima, by Henry Scott-Stokes (London : Owen, 1975 )
 La mort volontaire au Japon, by Maurice Pinguet (Gallimard, 1984 )
 Der Magnolienkaiser: Nachdenken über Yukio Mishima by  Hans Eppendorfer (1984)
 Teito Monogatari (vol. 5–10) by Hiroshi Aramata (a historical fantasy novel. Mishima appears in series No.5, and he reincarnates a woman Michiyo Ohsawa in series No.6), (Kadokawa Shoten 1985 )
 Yukio Mishima by Peter Wolfe ("reviews Mishima's life and times, discusses, his major works, and looks at important themes in his novels", 1989)
 Escape from the Wasteland: Romanticism and Realism in the Fiction of Mishima Yukio and Oe Kenzaburo (Harvard-Yenching Institute Monograph Series, No 33) by Susan J. Napier (Harvard University Press, 1991 )
 Deadly Dialectics: Sex, Violence, and Nihilism in the World of Yukio Mishima by Roy Starrs (University of Hawaii Press, 1994,  and )
 Rogue Messiahs: Tales of Self-Proclaimed Saviors by Colin Wilson (Mishima profiled in context of phenomenon of various "outsider" Messiah types), (Hampton Roads Publishing Company 2000 )
 Mishima ou la vision du vide (Mishima : A Vision of the Void), essay by Marguerite Yourcenar trans. by Alberto Manguel 2001 )
 Yukio Mishima, Terror and Postmodern Japan by Richard Appignanesi (2002)
 Yukio Mishima's Report to the Emperor by Richard Appignanesi (2003)
 The Madness and Perversion of Yukio Mishima by Jerry S. Piven. (Westport, Connecticut, Praeger Publishers, 2004 )
 Mishima's Sword – Travels in Search of a Samurai Legend by Christopher Ross (2006)
 Biografia Ilustrada de Mishima by Mario Bellatin (Argentina, Editorian Entropia, 2009)
 Impossible by Hisaki Matsuura (Kodansha, 2011) – A novel that assumed that Mishima has been survived the Mishima Incident.
 Persona: A Biography of Yukio Mishima by Naoki Inose with Hiroaki Sato (Berkeley, California, Stone Bridge Press, 2012)
 Yukio Mishima (Critical Lives) by Damian Flanagan (Reaktion Books, 2014)
 Portrait of the Author as a Historian by Alexander Lee – an analysis of the central political and social threads in Mishima's novels (pages 54–55 "History Today" April 2017)
 Mishima, Aesthetic Terrorist: An Intellectual Portrait by Andrew Rankin (University of Hawaii Press, 2018)

Film, TV
 Mishima: A Life in Four Chapters (1985), a film directed by Paul Schrader
 The Strange Case of Yukio Mishima (1985) BBC documentary directed by Michael Macintyre
 Yukio Mishima: Samurai Writer, a BBC documentary on Yukio Mishima, directed by Michael Macintyre, (1985, VHS , DVD )
 Miyabi: Yukio Mishima  (みやび 三島由紀夫) (2005), a documentary film directed by Chiyoko Tanaka
 11·25 jiketsu no hi: Mishima Yukio to wakamonotachi (2012), a film directed by Kōji Wakamatsu
 Mishima Yukio vs University of Tokyo Zenkyoto members: a truth of 50th year (三島由紀夫vs東大全共闘〜50年目の真実〜) (2020), a documentary film directed by 

Music
Harakiri, by Péter Eötvös (1973). An opera music composed based on the Japanese translation of István Bálint's poetry Harakiri that inspired by Mishima's hara-kiri. This work is included in 's album  on June 2014.
 String Quartet No.3, "Mishima", by Philip Glass. A reworking of parts of his soundtrack for the film Mishima: A Life in Four Chapters it has a duration of 18 minutes.
 Death and Night and Blood (Yukio), a song by The Stranglers from the Black and White album (1978) (Death and Night and Blood is the phrase from Mishima's novel Confessions of a Mask)
 Forbidden Colours, a song on Merry Christmas, Mr. Lawrence soundtrack by Ryuichi Sakamoto with lyrics by David Sylvian (1983). (Inspired by Mishima's novel Forbidden Colors)
  Sonatas for Yukio – C.P.E. Bach: Harpsichord Sonatas, by Jocelyne Cuiller (2011). A program composed of Bach sonatas for each scene of the novel "Spring Snow".

Play
 Yukio Mishima, a play by Adam Darius and Kazimir Kolesnik, first performed at Holloway Prison, London, in 1991, and later in Finland, Slovenia and Portugal.
 M, a ballet spectacle work homage to Mishima by Maurice Béjart in 1993

Manga, Game
 Shin Megami Tensei by Atlus (1992) – A character Gotou who started a coup in Ichigaya, modeled on Mishima.
 Tekken by Namco (1994) – Mishima surname comes from Yukio Mishima, and a main character Kazuya Mishima's way of thinking was based on Mishima.
 Jakomo Fosukari()  by Mari Yamazaki (2012) – The characters modeled on Mishima and Kōbō Abe appears in.

Poem
 Harakiri, by István Bálint.
 Grave of Mishima by Pierre Pascal (1970) – 12 Haiku poems and three Tanka poems. Appendix of 's book translated into French.

Art
The work was requested by Mishima in the fall of 1970, he went to Wakebe's atelier every Sunday. It was exhibited at the 6th Niccho Exhibition on 7 April 1976.
 Season of fiery fire / Requiem for someone: Number 1, Mishima and Classroom of beauty, listen quietly: bi-class, be quiet" by Yasumasa Morimura (2006, 2007) – Disguise performance as Mishima

See also
 Hachinoki kai – a chat circle to which Mishima belonged.
 Japan Business Federation attack – an incident in 1977 involving four persons (including one former Tatenokai member) connected by the Mishima incident.
 Kosaburo Eto – Mishima states that he was impressed with the seriousness of Eto's self-immolation, "the most intense criticism of politics as a dream or art."
 Kumo no kai – a literary movement group presided over by Kunio Kishida in 1950–1954, to which Mishima belonged.
 Mishima Yukio Prize – a literary award established in September 1987.
 Phaedo – the book Mishima had been reading in his later years.
 Suegen – a traditional authentic Japanese style restaurant in Shinbashi that is known as the last dining place for Mishima and four Tatenokai members (Masakatsu Morita, Hiroyasu Koga, Masahiro Ogawa, Masayoshi Koga).

Notes

References

Sources

 
 
 
 
 
 
 
 
 
 
 
 
 
 
 
 
 
 
 
  First original edition published 1966.
 
 
 
 
 
 
 
  This book is out of print now, for copyright violation.
  First edition published 1989.
  First edition published in May 1972.
 
 
 
  First edition published in November 1995.
 
 
 
 
 
 
  Paperback edition published in November 2016.
 
 
 
  Reprint edition published in November 2002 and April 2019.
 
 
  First edition published in July 1985.
 
  First edition published 1971.
  Paperback edition published 1996.
 
 
 
  Old edition published in June 1976. (Old edition was out of print due to Mishima's family's claim that the book had parts of what they didn't say.)
 
  First edition published in November 1987.
 
  First edition published in February 1993.
 
 
 
 
  Revision edition published in November 1998(Seiryu-shuppan). 
 
 
 
 
 
  First old edition published in March 2007 by Shinchosha.
 
  Paperback edition published in April 2010.
 
  First edition published in November 1981.
  First edition published in November 1996.
 
 

External links

 三島由紀夫文学館 The Mishima Yukio Literary Museum website In Japanese only, with the exception of one page (see "English Guide" at top right)
 山中湖文学の森公園「三島由紀夫文学館」Yamanakako Forest Park of Literature "Mishima Yukio Literary Museum" 
 
 
 Mishima chronology, with links
 YUKIO MISHIMA: The Harmony of Pen and Sword, a ceremony commemorating his 70th birthday
 , from a 1980s BBC documentary (9:02)
 , from Canadian Television (3:59)
  – Full NHK Interview in 1966 (9:21)
 Yukio Mishima's attempt at personal branding comes to light in the rediscovered 'Star', Nicolas Gattig, The Japan Times'' (27 April 2019)

 
1925 births
1970 suicides
1970s coups d'état and coup attempts
20th-century essayists
20th-century Japanese dramatists and playwrights
20th-century Japanese male actors
20th-century Japanese novelists
20th-century Japanese short story writers
20th-century poets
20th-century pseudonymous writers
Attempted coups in Japan
Bisexual male actors
Bisexual dramatists and playwrights
Bisexual novelists
Conservatism in Japan
Controversies in Japan
Deaths by decapitation
Far-right politics in Japan
Film controversies in Japan
Imperial Japanese Army personnel of World War II
Imperial Japanese Army soldiers
Japanese activists
Japanese anti-communists
Japanese bodybuilders
Japanese essayists
Japanese film directors
Japanese government officials
Japanese kendoka
Japanese male karateka
Japanese male models
Japanese male short story writers
Japanese nationalists
Japanese poets
Japanese psychological fiction writers
Japanese social commentators
Kabuki playwrights
Japanese bisexual people
LGBT film directors
LGBT models
Japanese LGBT novelists
Japanese LGBT dramatists and playwrights
Japanese LGBT actors
LGBT-related suicides
Male actors from Tokyo
Noh playwrights
Pantheists
People from Shinjuku
People of Shōwa-period Japan
People of the Empire of Japan
Seppuku from Meiji period to present
University of Tokyo alumni
Yomiuri Prize winners
Writers from Tokyo